Master Yi may refer to:

Yi I (1536–1584), Korean philosopher
Master Yi, character in 2018 Japanese TV series Inazuma Eleven: Ares
Master Yi, character in 2019 Chinese TV series See You Again
Master Yi, League of Legends character voiced by Keiji Fujiwara